Ards Rangers Football Club is a Northern Irish, intermediate football club playing in the Premier Division of the Northern Amateur Football League. The club was formed in 1949 and plays at Drome Park, Newtownards. Ards Rangers were admitted into the Amateur League in 1962. Their former manager was Lee Forsythe, who was the Young Northern Ireland manager of the Year (2009). The current side is managed by Jackie Kerr.

Honours

Intermediate honours
Northern Amateur Football League: 3
1997–98, 2011–12, 2014–15
Border Cup: 3
1966–67, 1979–80, 2014–15

Sources
 Johnstone & G. Hamilton (n.d.) A Memorable Milestone: 75 Years of the Northern Amateur Football League

External links
 nifootball.co.uk - (For fixtures, results and tables of all Northern Ireland amateur football leagues)

 

Association football clubs in Northern Ireland
Association football clubs established in 1949
Association football clubs in County Down
Northern Amateur Football League clubs
1949 establishments in Northern Ireland